Tim or Timothy Walsh may refer to:

Tim Walsh (American football) (born 1954), American football coach
Tim Walsh (footballer) (born 1985), Australian rules footballer
Tim Walsh (game inventor) (born 1964), American game inventor and writer
Tim Walsh (musician) (born 1975), indie rock singer, songwriter, and producer
Tim Walsh (rugby union) (born 1979), Australian rugby union coach and former captain of Newbury R.F.C.
B. Timothy Walsh, professor of pediatric psychopharmacology